Jason Parris (born 5 June 1982) is a Barbadian cricketer. He played in eight first-class and eight List A matches for Barbados and Combined Campuses and Colleges from 2002 to 2009.

See also
 List of Barbadian representative cricketers

References

External links
 

1982 births
Living people
Barbadian cricketers
Barbados cricketers
Combined Campuses and Colleges cricketers